Smallwood is a hamlet (and census-designated place) in Sullivan County, New York, United States. The population was 839 at the 2020 census.

It was founded in the 1920s as the vacation community "Mountain Lakes", but was later renamed after its founder A.N. Smallwood.

History

Smallwood is known for its early-20th century style log cabins and camps constructed by immigrants in the 1930s. A unique feature of the community is that the original home construction materials were locally sourced: Smallwood cabins were constructed of wood lumbered and milled on site, and the distinctive stone fireplaces found in most cabins were built of limestone quarried in Smallwood in the 1920s to 1950s. Most of these historic cabin structures survive as both summer and year-round residences.

The Smallwood development, as envisioned by developer A.N. Smallwood, was originally a "restricted" community, i.e., homes were available only to individuals who were eligible for membership in the Mountain Lakes Country Club, which was restricted to "caucasians of the Christian faith", according to literature and sales brochures. This began to change in the 1940s, but many deeds contained restrictive covenants into the 1950s. In the past few decades, the community has become very diverse, comprising local year-round residents as well as summer-home owners who hail primarily from the New York metropolitan area and south Florida.

Running water for many Smallwood homes is only available on a seasonal basis from April to October. Other homes which have been winterized have wells.

Recreation
Centrally located in the Hamlet of Smallwood, Mountain Lake is a private holding of the Smallwood Civic Association (SWCA). Only dues paying members of the Association have access to the approximate 65 acre man-made Lake and other facilities owned and operated by the SWCA such the as a beach, tennis and pickelball courts, basketball court, playground, ball field, and Lodge. Minnie Falls is a popular water fall and part of a large public park operated by the Town of Bethel called, The Forest Reserve at Smallwood. The Reserve features hiking trails for year-round outdoor activities as well as a large dog park The Falls are part of White Lake Brook, a water system which, upon entering Smallwood becomes Mountain Lake, and upon crossing over the lake’s dam becomes White Lake Brook again. The Club at Smallwood, also located in the community, is also private. While an entity separate from the SWCA, some “Smallwoodians” maintain memberships in both organizations.The Club offers a heated pool and recreational activities in the summer months. Both the Civic Association and Club at Smallwood are open to dues-paying residents. Smallwood residents also have access to the nearby and public, Lake Superior State Park(operated by Sullivan County)and the public Toronto Reservoir, which is adjacent to Smallwood and located at the end of Pine Grove Road. The Toronto access — permitted by the Federal Energy Regulatory Commission (FERC) allows for swimming and has a public motor-boat launch for fishing and other boating activities.

Geography
Smallwood is located at  (41.660573, -74.814507).

Demographics

As of the census of 2000, there were 566 people, 259 households, and 148 families residing in the CDP. The population density was 365.5 per square mile (141.0/km2). There were 1,012 housing units at an average density of 653.5/sq mi (252.1/km2). The racial makeup of the CDP was 96.47% White, 0.88% African American, 0.71% Native American, 0.88% from other races, and 1.06% from two or more races. Hispanic or Latino of any race were 3.53% of the population.

There were 259 households, out of which 22.0% had children under the age of 18 living with them, 46.3% were married couples living together, 8.9% had a female householder with no husband present, and 42.5% were non-families. 36.3% of all households were made up of individuals, and 15.8% had someone living alone who was 65 years of age or older. The average household size was 2.17 and the average family size was 2.86.

In the CDP, the population was spread out, with 20.0% under the age of 18, 5.1% from 18 to 24, 24.9% from 25 to 44, 30.7% from 45 to 64, and 19.3% who were 65 years of age or older. The median age was 45 years. For every 100 females, there were 97.2 males. For every 100 females age 18 and over, there were 100.4 males.

The median income for a household in the CDP was $46,845, and the median income for a family was $52,396. Males had a median income of $50,104 versus $50,375 for females. The per capita income for the CDP was $31,035. About 6.9% of families and 8.9% of the population were below the poverty line, including 10.3% of those under age 18 and 19.4% of those age 65 or over.

References

Census-designated places in New York (state)
Hamlets in New York (state)
Census-designated places in Sullivan County, New York
Ukrainian communities in the United States
Hamlets in Sullivan County, New York